Dionna M. Harris (born 4 March 1968) is an American, former collegiate right-handed softball second basemen and outfielder, originally from Wilmington, Delaware. She played two years for the defunct Temple Owls softball team from 1989 to 1990 in the Atlantic 10 Conference, where as a junior was named Player of The Year. She was also an Olympic champion and competed at the 1996 Summer Olympics in Atlanta.

Career
Harris attended and played softball at Delcastle Technical High School in Wilmington, Delaware and Delaware Technical Community College. After graduating from community college, she attended Temple University, where she played second base and was named the 1990 Temple University Player of the Year. Following college, Harris joined the Amateur Softball Association and played outfielder for the Connecticut Brakettes (1990-1994) and the California Jazz (1995-1996). Harris made the United States National team from 1993 to 1996, earning gold medals at the 1993 Intercontinental Cup, 1994 PanAm Games, 1995 Australian Games and 1996 Olympic Games. In 2001, Harris was inducted into the Delaware Sports Museum and Hall of Fame.

Statistics

Temple Owls

Team USA

References

External links
 

1968 births
Living people
Softball players from Delaware
Temple Owls softball players
Olympic softball players of the United States
Softball players at the 1996 Summer Olympics
Olympic gold medalists for the United States in softball
Softball players
Medalists at the 1996 Summer Olympics
Junior college softball players in the United States